Prof William Hallowes Miller FRS HFRSE LLD DCL (6 April 180120 May 1880) was a Welsh mineralogist and laid the foundations of modern crystallography.

Miller indices are named after him, the method having been described in his Treatise on Crystallography (1839).  The mineral known as millerite is named after him.

Life and work 

Miller was born in 1801 at Velindre near Llandovery, Carmarthenshire, South Wales.  He was educated at St John's College, Cambridge, where he graduated in 1826 as fifth wrangler.  He became a Fellow there in 1829. For a few years Miller was occupied as a college tutor and during this time he published treatises on hydrostatics and hydrodynamics.

Miller also gave special attention to crystallography, and at 31 years old, on the resignation of William Whewell he succeeded in 1832 to the professorship of mineralogy, a post he held until 1870. Miller's chief work, on Crystallography, was published in 1839. He was elected to the Royal Society in 1838 and received the Royal Medal in 1870, and in the same year was appointed on the International Commission du Metre. He was elected an Honorary Fellow of the Royal Society of Edinburgh in 1874.

Miller was the main thrust in reforming the Parliamentary standards of length and weight, after a fire which in 1834 destroyed the old standards. He was a member of the committee as well as on the Royal Commission which oversaw these new standards.

Miller died in 1880 in Cambridge, England.

Family

In 1844 he married Harriet Susan Minty.

Selected writings

William Hallowes Miller (1831)  The Elements of Hydrostatics and Hydrodynamics
William Hallowes Miller (1833) An Elementary Treatise on the Differential Calculus
William Hallowes Miller (1839)  A Treatise on Crystallography
William Phillips, William Hallowes Miller, & Henry James Brooke (1852) An Elementary Introduction to Mineralogy
William Hallowes Miller (1863) A Tract on Crystallography

In 1852 Miller edited a new edition of H. J. Brooke's Elementary Introduction to Mineralogy.

References

1801 births
1880 deaths
Alumni of St John's College, Cambridge
Welsh mineralogists
People from Carmarthenshire
Royal Medal winners
British crystallographers
Fellows of the Royal Society
Fellows of the Royal Society of Edinburgh
Fellows of St John's College, Cambridge
Professors of Mineralogy (Cambridge)